The PPL Building, formerly the Pennsylvania Power and Light Building, is a 24-story,  office building in Allentown, Pennsylvania. It is the tallest building in the city and the tallest in the Lehigh Valley. The building serves as the headquarters for PPL Corporation, the main electric utility for the Lehigh Valley.

The PPL Building is often uniquely illuminated at night, especially during the Christmas season, with a candle on one face of the building, and a Christmas tree on the other.  During the 1960s, PPL supported the local United Fund community fund drive program by using the building's brightly lit windows at night to spell out the abbreviation "U.F." to remind area residents to contribute to the fund drive.

History
The PPL Building was built from 1926 to 1928. It was built by Pennsylvania Power & Light, forerunner of PPL, and to this day has been the headquarters of the company. The building was designed by architect and skyscraper pioneer Harvey Wiley Corbett, who would later have a hand in designing New York City's Rockefeller Center and other prominent buildings. The building exterior features bas reliefs by Alexander Archipenko. In 1930, the PPL Building was named the "best example of a modern office building" by Encyclopædia Britannica, and also featured the world's fastest elevator.

In popular culture
Exterior shots of the PPL Building appear in the 1954 motion picture Executive Suite.

References

Buildings and structures in Allentown, Pennsylvania
Skyscrapers in Pennsylvania
Skyscraper office buildings in Pennsylvania
Office buildings completed in 1928